James Paringatai (born 7 January 1986) is a New Zealand basketball player for the Toowoomba Mountaineers of the Queensland State League (QSL). He played 13 seasons in the National Basketball League (NBL), with his most notable stint coming with the Southland Sharks between 2010 and 2016. He captained the Sharks to NBL championships in 2013 and 2015. In June 2016, he moved to Australia to play in the State Basketball League (SBL). He was a member of the Geraldton Buccaneers' 2019 SBL championship-winning team.

Early life
Paringatai was born in Taihape, played two seasons with Wanganui City College, and went to Australia with the New Zealand under-20 and under-23 teams. Growing up in Taihape, Paringatai loved being outdoors and spending time with family. He played rugby union as a youth before picking up basketball as an early teenager.

Basketball career
Paringatai debuted in the National Basketball League (NBL) with the Manawatu Jets in 2004 as an 18-year-old. In December that year, he trialled with the Sydney Kings of the Australian NBL. Paringatai was described as a "mini Pero Cameron" in his early years in the NBL and seemed destined to play for the Tall Blacks. However, his development was hampered by a lack of consistency and conditioning issues.

In 2005, Paringatai played for the Wellington Saints. The next three years were spent with the Manawatu Jets before his move to New Plymouth in 2009. He had a breakout season during the Taranaki Dynamos' zero-win, 16-loss campaign – averaging 13 points a game and starting in every match he was available for.

Paringatai was one of the first players to sign with the Southland Sharks for their inaugural season in 2010. He started for Southland in the first half of the 2010 season, but was consigned to a role off the bench after that, a role that stemmed into the 2011 season. Following the 2011 season, he made a conscious decision to get fitter in the off-season and alter his eating habits; he subsequently shed 14 kilograms. In May 2012, Paringatai became the first player in the club's history to play 50 games. He captained the Sharks in their first game in the league in March 2010, and went on to play in 50 straight games.

In 2013, Paringatai was captain of the Sharks' maiden championship-winning team. He also won the FIBA Pacific Games with the NZ Maori team. Paringatai had a solid 2013 NBL season, capped in the 114–67 rout of the Otago Nuggets where in 13 minutes he shot five of seven from the field, dropped a three pointer, and added five rebounds.

In 2015, Paringatai became the first player to bring up 100 games for the Sharks. As co-captain, he helped the Sharks win their second championship in three years.

In November 2015, Paringatai re-signed with the Sharks for the 2016 season. Described by the club as the "ultimate team man", Paringatai said at the time there were other offers on the table, but he never wanted to leave the Sharks.

In June 2016, Paringatai joined the Mandurah Magic of the State Basketball League (SBL).

In January 2017, it was announced that Paringatai would not be returning to the Sharks for the 2017 season, after being offered a contract to once again play in the SBL. He was originally recruited by the Kalamunda Eastern Suns, but it did not pan out. He subsequently joined the Geraldton Buccaneers. He played his third season with Geraldton in 2019 and was a member of the Buccaneers' championship-winning team. He continued on with the Buccaneers in 2020 for the West Coast Classic.

In April 2022, Paringatai joined the Toowoomba Mountaineers of the third-tiered Queensland State League (QSL).

Personal
Paringatai is the son of Parry and Sarah. In 2011, Paringatai became a father for the first time, when son Cooper-James was born. In 2013, Paringatai graduated with his Bachelor of Sport and Recreation degree from the Southern Institute of Technology.

Paringatai is close friends with former Southland Stags fullback Glen Horton, and fellow basketball player Jeremiah Trueman.

References

External links

QSL player profile
Southland Sharks player profile

1986 births
Living people
Manawatu Jets players
New Zealand expatriate basketball people in Australia
New Zealand men's basketball players
People from Taihape
Power forwards (basketball)
Southland Sharks players
Taranaki Mountainairs players
Wellington Saints players